Salem Bear Creek Church, Salem Evangelical Lutheran Church (Ellerton Lutheran and German Reformed Church District) is a historic district roughly bounded by Union Road, Dayton Germantown Pike, and Bear Creek in Moraine, Ohio.

The area was added to the National Register of Historic Places in 1990.

References

Lutheran churches in Ohio
Churches on the National Register of Historic Places in Ohio
Gothic Revival church buildings in Ohio
Churches completed in 1817
Churches in Montgomery County, Ohio
National Register of Historic Places in Montgomery County, Ohio
Pennsylvania Dutch culture in Ohio